The Vincent Smith School is an independent, co-ed school located in the Incorporated Village of Flower Hill in Nassau County, on Long Island, in New York, United States.

Overview 
The Vincent Smith school opened in 1924. It is co-ed, and specializes in educating students with learning disabilities between grades 1 and 12. It is associated with the New York State Association of Independent Schools. The school colors are blue and yellow. The school is named for Adelaide Vincent Smith, its founder.

In 1963, the Vincent Smith School acquired a new, additional building adjacent to the existing school. This new building allowed the school resume teaching 8th grade. This new building houses dining facilities, a science lab, classrooms, a library, and offices for the school's administration. When opened, this building handled grades 5 through 8.

In 1970, the school, which was slated to permanently close due to financial difficulties, was saved by parents. At the time, the school was faced with a deficit of $60,000 (1970 USD), and was in search of $500 in monthly rent, which resulted in the school's 9-member board deciding to close the school. 60% of the school's parents responded by meeting with the school board and assisted them in meeting a $30,000 bank loan. Furthermore, several teachers and parents donated money to help support the school; a teacher contributed $100 from her salary each month and a parent who was a retired police officer from Queens donated $125 via check.

Administration 
The table below contains the administrators of the Vincent Smith School, as of October of 2020:

Demographics 
The Vincent Smith School's student-teacher ratio is 3:1, and has 57 enrolled students. 23% of students are female, and 77% are male. 

The table below shows the racial makeup of the Vincent Smith School's student body:

References

External links 
Vincent Smith School official website

Flower Hill, New York
Schools in Nassau County, New York
Private schools in New York (state)